Western Macedonia is an administrative region in northern Greece.

Western Macedonia may also refer to:

 western parts of the geographical and historical region of Macedonia
 western parts of the modern North Macedonia
 western parts of the ancient Kingdom of Macedonia
 western parts of the ancient Roman Province of Macedonia
 Decentralized Administration of Epirus and Western Macedonia, an administrative unit in Greece
 Mala Prespa and Golloborda, regions in eastern Albania
 Technological Educational Institute of Western Macedonia, an institute in Kozani, Greece
 University of Western Macedonia, a university in Kozani and Florina, Greece
 Western Macedonia Army Section, an army group of the Hellenic Army in World War II

See also
 Macedonia (disambiguation)
 Eastern Macedonia (disambiguation)